The 2012 H.E. Mahinda Rajapaksa Under-23 International Football Trophy Final was a football match at the Jayathilake Sports Complex, Nawalapitiya on 9 December 2012, to determine the winner of the 2012 H.E. Mahinda Rajapaksa Under-23 International Football Trophy. It was the first H.E. Mahinda Rajapaksa Under-23 International Football Trophy final. The match was contested by the Maldives and Pakistan.

Maldives won the match 2–1 after 90 minutes; Maldives opened the scoring through Rilwan Waheed's free kick just after half-time, before Assadhulla Abdulla doubled the lead with a long through ball from Rilwan. Pakistan's goal was an own goal which was deflected by Moosa Yaamin after a shot by Saed Ahmed.

Route to the final

Match

Details

See also
2012 H.E. Mahinda Rajapaksa Under-23 International Football Trophy

References

2012 in Asian football
2012 in Sri Lanka